Hoseyn Mashlush (also Romanized as Ḩoseyn Mashlūsh; also known as Ḩoseyn Mashkūsh) is a village in Seyyed Abbas Rural District, Shavur District, Shush County, Khuzestan Province, Iran. At the 2006 census, its population was 612, in 102 families.

References 

Populated places in Shush County